The 2021–22 Sacred Heart Pioneers men's basketball team represented Sacred Heart University in the 2021–22 NCAA Division I men's basketball season. The Pioneers, led by ninth-year head coach Anthony Latina, played their home games at the William H. Pitt Center in Fairfield, Connecticut as members of the Northeast Conference (NEC).

Previous season
In a season limited due to the ongoing COVID-19 pandemic, the Pioneers finished the 2020–21 season 9–9, 9–7 in NEC play to finish in a tie for third place. Due to complications caused by the pandemic, only the top four teams were eligible to participate in the NEC tournament. The Pioneers lost to Bryant in the semifinals.

Roster

Schedule and results
NEC COVID-19 policy provided that if a team could not play a conference game due to COVID-19 issues within its program, the game would be declared a forfeit and the other team would receive a conference win. However, wins related to COVID-19 do not count pursuant to NCAA policy.

|-
!colspan=12 style=| Non-conference regular season

|-
!colspan=12 style=| NEC regular season

|-
!colspan=9 style=| NEC tournament

Sources

References

Sacred Heart Pioneers men's basketball seasons
Sacred Heart
Sacred Heart Pioneers men's basketball
Sacred Heart Pioneers men's basketball